The Peterborough railway line was a railway line on the South Australian Railways network. It extended from a junction at Roseworthy on the Morgan railway line through Hamley Bridge, Riverton, initially to Tarlee, then extended in stages to Peterborough.

History
The Burra Burra railway was initially proposed as early as 1850, before any other railways north from Port Adelaide. Before anything was done about this, the Gawler railway line was built in 1857, and extended to Kapunda in 1860 (and eventually to Morgan in 1878, see Morgan railway line). The first stage of the broad gauge Burra line from a junction at Roseworthy to Forresters (now Tarlee) opened on 3 July 1869. It extended to Manoora on 21 February 1870,  Burra on 29 August 1870, Hallett on 10 March 1878 and Terowie on 14 December 1880.

Terowie was a break of gauge station with the line continuing north to Peterborough as a narrow gauge line, opening on 11 May 1881. On 12 January 1970, this 22.9-kilometre section was converted to broad gauge in 1970, thus making Peterborough the break of gauge point with the narrow gauge Peterborough to Quorn and standard gauge Port Pirie to Broken Hill lines. 
Regular Australian National passenger services ceased in December 1986, with the line north of Hallett closed on 26 July 1988, followed by the Burra to Hallett section on 14 November 1990. The line north of Burra was removed in 1992/93.
The last passenger train to operate to Peterborough was a Steamrail tour using Victorian locomotive R761, while the last passenger train to use the remaining line to Burra was a SteamRanger tour hauled by former SAR steam locomotive 621 on 19 September 1992.

On the 1st of November 1997, Australian Southern Railroad acquired a 50-year lease on the rail corridor and total ownership of the rail infrastructure as part of Australian National's South Australian freight assets sale to ASR. Grain services all the way to Burra last operated in January 1999, with the line from Saddleworth to Burra last used by an Australian Railroad Group (formerly ASR) locomotive in March 2004. In the same month, the last passenger train operated on the line, a Friends of Belair Railway Station charter to Riverton using 3000 class railcars. The last grain train to Saddleworth operated in 2006, with the last train on the line being a Roseworthy grain operated by Genesee and Wyoming Australia (formerly ARG) in 2007. In theory the line remains open in a dormant condition but has not seen a train in many years. The line has fallen into disrepair, being damaged by natural disasters and being severed at several points for drainage and road surface improvements. The lease of the land and ownership of the rail infrastructure held by One Rail Australia (formerly GWA) passed to Aurizon in 2022, following their purchase of ORA.

References

Closed railway lines in South Australia
Railway lines opened in 1869